Habrosyne petrographa is a moth in the family Drepanidae. It is found in China (Henan, Shaanxi, Gansu, Hunan, Jiangxi, Hubei, Fujian, Sichuan, Yunnan) and Taiwan.

The wingspan is 35–39 mm.

Subspecies
Habrosyne petrographa petrographa
Habrosyne petrographa tapaishana Werny 1966 (Taiwan)

References

Moths described in 1867
Thyatirinae